Company Sergeant Major Edward Thomas Chapman VC, BEM (13 January 1920 – 3 February 2002) was a Welsh recipient of the Victoria Cross, the highest award for gallantry in the face of the enemy that can be awarded to British and Commonwealth forces.

Early life
Ted Chapman was born in Pontlottyn, near Rhymney, the son of a coal miner. He left school at age 14 and like many of his generation followed his father underground at the Ogilvie Colliery.

He enlisted in the British Army in April 1940, during the Second World War, joining the Monmouthshire Regiment and seeing action from his battalion's landing shortly after the D-Day landings of 6 June 1944 through the advance into North-west Europe. He was wounded at Falaise in the breakout from the Normandy bridgehead.

Details
Chapman was 25 years old, and a corporal in the 3rd Battalion, Monmouthshire Regiment, British Army during the Second World War when the following action took place for which he was awarded the VC.

On 2 April 1945, near the Dortmund-Ems canal, Germany, Corporal Chapman's section came under heavy machine-gun fire from German units dug in and concealed, causing many casualties. He ordered his men to take cover and went forward alone with a Bren gun, mowing down the enemy at point-blank range, forcing them to retire. His section isolated, Corporal Chapman again halted the enemy advances with his Bren gun, at one time firing it over his shoulder while lying supine on his back in a shallow fold in the ground, to cover those bringing him ammunition. He then carried in his Company Commander, an officer, who was lying wounded, but on the way back the officer was killed by further German fire and Corporal Chapman wounded in the thigh. Refusing hospitalisation he returned to his section and ensured the consolidation of the ground gained which took a further two hours of fighting.

Honours and awards
 13 July 1945 – Teutoburger Wald, Germany, 2 April 1945, Corporal Edward Thomas Chapman, 3rd Bn, Monmouthshire Regiment:

Later life
He later achieved the rank of company sergeant major.  In the Coronation Honours List of 1953, he was awarded the British Empire Medal. He lived in New Inn, Torfaen until his death on 3 February 2002 aged 82, and is buried in Panteg cemetery near New Inn. He worked at ICI Fibres at Pontypool for 25 years. He was a noted breeder of Welsh Mountain Ponies which he exhibited and showed at the Royal Welsh Show at Builth Wells.

References

 British VCs of World War 2 (John Laffin, 1997)
 Monuments to Courage (David Harvey, 1999)
 The Register of the Victoria Cross (This England, 1997)
 Tony Williams, Stephen Power, Edwin King, Brandon Smith

External links
Obituary from the Times online
 Edward Chapman's VC information and details

British World War II recipients of the Victoria Cross
1920 births
2002 deaths
Monmouthshire Regiment soldiers
British Army personnel of World War II
People from Rhymney
Recipients of the British Empire Medal
Welsh soldiers
British Army recipients of the Victoria Cross
Welsh recipients of the Victoria Cross